Character is the seventh studio album by the Swedish melodic death metal band Dark Tranquillity. The album was first released on 24 January 2005 through Century Media Records. The corresponding single, "Lost to Apathy", was previously featured on the Lost to Apathy EP, their first EP released in nearly ten years. 

This album is heavier than the band's previous album, with more aggressive and faster songs. Like the band's previous album, there are no clean vocals.
The enhanced CD and digipak editions of the album include the video clip for the single "Lost to Apathy". A music video was also made for "The New Build". The album was also released as an LP with different cover art.

Track listing

Japanese version 
The Japanese version of the album contains two bonus tracks previously released on the Lost to Apathy EP:

Digipak edition 
There is a second CD included with the digipak. It includes the following tracks:

 Track 1 is the music video version of the song. Tracks 2–5 were recorded live at the Busan Rock Festival in 2004 in Korea.

Credits 
Musicians
 Mikael Stanne − vocals
 Niklas Sundin − lead guitar
 Martin Henriksson − rhythm guitar
 Michael Nicklasson − bass
 Martin Brändström − keyboards, electronics
 Anders Jivarp − drums

Album production
 Drums recorded at Studio Fredman
 Guitars, Bass, Vocals recorded at The Room
 Electronics recorded at Rogue Music
 Mixed by Fredrik Nordström at Studio Fredman
 Mastered by Peter In de Betou at Tailor Maid
 Produced by Dark Tranquillity

Other credits
 Album artwork and design by Cabin Fever Media
 Live photos appearing on album artwork by Diana van Tankeren
 Music videos for "Lost to Apathy and "The New Build" directed by Roger Johansson and Alex Hansson for Bobby Works AB
 Music videos for "Lost to Apathy and "The New Build" produced by Roger Johansson
 Lyrics written by Mikael Stanne

Charts

References

External links 
 
 Character at Century Media Records

2005 albums
Albums recorded at Studio Fredman
Century Media Records albums
Dark Tranquillity albums